The Tomlinson Lift Bridge is a crossing of the Quinnipiac River in New Haven, Connecticut. The bridge forms a segment of U.S. Route 1. The Tomlinson Vertical Lift Bridge carries four lanes of traffic across New Haven Harbor and a single-track freight line owned by the Providence & Worcester Railroad that connects the waterfront with the Northeast Corridor line of Metro North and CSX.  A sidewalk is present along the southern edge of the bridge.

History
The first bridge here was erected in 1797 by Isaac Tomlinson's group to replace profits from their ferry ruined by a new bridge.  This -wide covered wooden truss bridge included a draw to allow vessels through.  It has also been described as a "wood and sandstone" bridge.

The second bridge, 1885-1922, was an iron bridge which was never particularly good, having been salvaged from a scrap yard, and not thought well of even before then.  By 1913, this bridge was opening 17,000 times a year.  Plans for replacement were created during World War I.

The third bridge on-site was a  trunioned double-leaf bascule drawbridge with its counterweights in a closed pit underneath, built between 1921 and 1924. It was designed by engineer Ernest W. Wiggin of New Haven in the Beaux-Arts style, based on a bascule design by Joseph B. Strauss. Before the completion of the adjacent Q Bridge, it was carrying 30,000 vehicles a day. The builder was the Phoenix Bridge Company of Philadelphia, Pennsylvania.

The mechanism raises the lift span  with  counterweights on each of the two  towers on either end. It provides a channel with  horizontal clearance and  vertical clearance when the span is closed, and an additional  vertical clearance when it is open.

The project was part of the New Haven Harbor Crossing Improvement Program Securing the bridge's lift piers initially proved difficult because rock elevation and slope differed along the route. To secure the piers, teeth were welded to the tip of 20-in-diameter pile shells that were then drilled into the bedrock. For some piles, an adequate seal was not achieved until the pile had been seated into 5 ft. of bedrock.

See also
 List of bridges documented by the Historic American Engineering Record in Connecticut
 List of movable bridges in Connecticut

References

External links

Railroad bridges in Connecticut
Transportation in New Haven, Connecticut
U.S. Route 1
Buildings and structures in New Haven, Connecticut
Historic American Engineering Record in Connecticut
Road bridges in Connecticut
Road-rail bridges in the United States
Bridges of the United States Numbered Highway System
Steel bridges in the United States
Vertical lift bridges in the United States
Bridges in New Haven County, Connecticut
Providence and Worcester Railroad